Juan Carlos Figueiras (born 1957) is an Argentine composer and pianist.

That same year, Legends on texts by Marta Giustozzi was premiered by the National Symphony Youth Orchestra Jose de San Martin, choirs Lagun Onak and UBA School of Law and Marta Blanco as a soloist under the general direction of Maestro Mario Benzecry. In works such as Solaris, Michael Obst adopts a modernist sensibility while at the same time questioning its underlying philosophy.

References

Works cited

External links 
 Biography and Photo 

1957 births
Living people
Argentine classical composers
20th-century classical composers
21st-century classical composers
Male classical composers
20th-century male musicians
21st-century male musicians